Anthony Gilbert Swann (born 27 March 1975) is a former professional rugby league footballer who represented both New Zealand and Samoa in international rugby league.

Background
He was educated at Liston College, Henderson.

Playing career
Swann's career started with the Waitakere City Raiders in the 1994 Lion Red Cup, before he signed with the Auckland Warriors, joining their reserve grade side. He made the Warriors' first grade side in 1996 and played 36 times for the club. He was a New Zealand representative in 1996, playing in three test matches.

After this Swann spent a year with the North Sydney Bears where he was in the lineup for North Sydney's last ever first grade game against The North Queensland Cowboys in Townsville scoring a try.

He spent a season and a half with the Canberra Raiders before moving to England to join the Warrington Wolves. Swann played for Samoa at the 2000 World Cup.

In 2002 he switched to rugby union, and played for the Bay of Plenty Steamers.

In 2004 Swann returned to Auckland, playing rugby league for the Mt Albert Lions in the Bartercard Cup, and representative football for the Auckland side.

Later years
After retiring from rugby Swann became a teacher at Glen Eden Intermediate School.

Personal life
His brother, Willie, and his cousin, Logan Swann, both played for the Auckland Warriors.

References

External links
Anthony Swann Rugby League in New Zealand

1975 births
Living people
Auckland rugby league team players
Canberra Raiders players
Date of birth missing (living people)
East Coast Bays Barracudas players
Marist Saints players
Mount Albert Lions players
New Zealand national rugby league team players
New Zealand people of I-Kiribati descent
New Zealand sportspeople of Samoan descent
New Zealand rugby league players
New Zealand rugby union players
New Zealand schoolteachers
New Zealand Warriors players
North Sydney Bears players
People educated at Liston College
Place of birth missing (living people)
Rugby league centres
Samoa national rugby league team players
Waitakere rugby league team players
Warrington Wolves players